Alan McLean is a Canadian retired ice hockey Center who was an All-American for North Dakota and was the Most Outstanding Player of the 1963 NCAA Tournament.

Career
McLean made a name for himself as a junior player for the Melville Millionaires. He was recruited to North Dakota in 1960 and began playing with the varsity club the following season. McLean led a fairly weak Fighting Sioux squad in goals (19), assists (19) and points (38) but the team finished 5th in the WCHA and was left out of the conference tournament. The following year the team coalesced around a core of upperclassmen with McLean again leading the team in scoring. This time UND tied Denver for the regular season WCHA title and McLean was on both All-WCHA First Team and an All-American. The fighting Sioux swept aside defending national champion Michigan Tech in the semifinal and, though they fell to the Pioneers in the final, UND had already earned a bid to the 1963 NCAA Tournament.

North Dakota dominated Boston College in the semifinal, winning 8–2 and found themselves facing Denver once more for the national championship. UND got off to a blistering start, scoring 5 goals in the first period and led 5-2 after 20 minutes. McLean scored his second goal of the game 5 minutes into the second and then the team held on for dear life as Denver attempted to erase the Sighting Sioux's advantage. The Pioneers scored three timed before the end of the match but they couldn't get the equalizer and McLean's tally held up as the game-winner. McLean was named as the Tournament Most Outstanding Player.

McLean left UND after the season to play for the Canadian National Team but was not selected for the Olympic roster. He finished out his college career playing closer to home with the UBC Thunderbirds and later briefly appeared for the Vancouver Canucks before retiring. He was inducted into the North Dakota Letterwinners Hall of Fame in 1997.

Career statistics

Regular season and playoffs

Awards and honors

References

External links

1939 births
Living people
Canadian ice hockey centres
Ice hockey people from British Columbia
Sportspeople from New Westminster
Melville Millionaires players
North Dakota Fighting Hawks men's ice hockey players
UBC Thunderbirds players
Vancouver Canucks (WHL) players
NCAA men's ice hockey national champions
AHCA Division I men's ice hockey All-Americans